Danny Lim (born 7 November 1975 in Malacca, Malaysia) is a Malaysian writer, journalist and photographer.

Published works 
His articles and photography have been published in publications like Off the Edge (Malaysia), Malaysiakini, The Nut Graph (Malaysia) and The Sun. His work has also been featured in the Far Eastern Economic Review.

His first book was The Malaysian Book of the Undead (2008, Matahari Books), a light-hearted compendium of Malaysian ghosts and supernatural beings.

He has served as still photographer for a few Malaysian films including The Big Durian and Apa Khabar Orang Kampung.

He also made a short video documentary 18? (2005) which is about political graffiti in Kuala Lumpur. It can be downloaded for free from his website.

His photo-essay Aku, Hang & Demo was published in New Malaysian Essays 2 in 2009.

References

External links
 Photography by Danny Lim
 Danny Lim video interview – The Fairly Current Show
 18? download link

Malaysian writers
1975 births
Living people
People from Malacca